John Aldridge starred for Tranmere Rovers F.C. as they reached the Coca-Cola Cup semi finals in 1993–94. Tranmere were early First Division leaders after winning seven of their opening eleven matches, and regained first position in mid-December following three straight wins. John King's side defeated Oxford United 6–2, Grimsby Town 4–1, Oldham Athletic 3–0 and Nottingham Forest 2–0 in the Coca-Cola Cup, before losing on penalties to Aston Villa after a 4–4 draw in the semi-finals. They faltered in the promotion race, but qualified for the play-offs after five wins in six games, losing 2–1 to Leicester City in the semi-finals.

Final league table

References 

 

 

Tranmere Rovers F.C. seasons
Tranmere Rovers